Walcher (died 1080) was bishop of Durham and earl of Northumbria.

Walcher may also refer to:

Surname
Achim Walcher (born 1967), Austrian cross-country skier
Jacob Walcher (1887–1970), German politician
Josef Walcher (1954–1984), Austrian alpine ski racer
Kathleen Walcher (fl. 2003–2006), American politician
Rocky Walcher (born 1961), American golfer

Given name
Walcher of Malvern (died 1135), prior of Great Malvern

See also
 Walcheren